Manah may refer to:

Manah, Oman, a town in Oman
Manāt, one of the three chief goddesses of Mecca.